Creatures of Habit is the seventh album by the American musician Billy Squier, released in 1991. "She Goes Down" was the first single. Squier supported the album with a North American tour.

The album peaked at No. 117 on the Billboard album chart. According to Nielsen SoundScan, it had sold just 85,000 copies at the time of its deletion.

Critical reception

The Calgary Herald wrote that "Squier's vocal abilities are so limited it's amazing his career has lasted for more than one album." The Ottawa Citizen called the album "formula arena rock  ... you've heard it all before." The Chicago Tribune noted that "although Squier's fans might have grown up, new songs such as 'She Goes Down' and '(L-O-V-E) Four Letter Word' show that Squier hasn't."

Track listing
All songs written by Billy Squier except as indicated.

 "Young at Heart" - 5:06
 "She Goes Down" (Squier, Laura McDonald) - 4:07
 "Lover" - 4:48
 "Hollywood" - 4:57
 "Conscience Point" - 5:27
 "Nerves on Ice" - 5:05
 "Hands of Seduction" - 5:32
 "Facts of Life" - 4:31
 "(L.O.V.E.) Four Letter Word" - 4:56
 "Strange Fire" - 4:03
 "Alone in Your Dreams (Don't Say Goodbye)" - 5:06

Personnel

 Kenny Aaronson - Lap Steel Guitar
 Dave Asofsky	- Assistant
 Steve Boyer - Engineer
 Jimmy Bralower - Drum Programming
 Bobby Chouinard - Drums
 Mark Clarke - Bass
 Victor Deyglio - Assistant
 Godfrey Diamond - Producer
 Ben Fowler - Assistant
 Jeff Golub - Guitar
 Alex Haas - Mixing, Overdubs
 Scott Hull - Pre-Mastering
 Doug Lubahn	- Vocals (Background)
 George Marino - Mastering
 Dave O'Donnell - Engineer
 Bill Scheniman	Engineer
 Art Smith	Drum Technician
 Billy Squier	- Art Direction, Composer, Guitar, Primary Artist, Producer, Vocals, Vocals (Background)
 Alan St. Jon - Keyboards, Synthesizer, Vocals
 Tommy Steele - Art Direction
 Mark Weiss - Photography

References

Billy Squier albums
1991 albums
Capitol Records albums